Steno Tedeschi (1881–1911) was an Italian intellectual and academic. His works were associated with the ideas of the Graz School and he is noted for contributing to its object theory and Stephan Witasek's aesthetics. Tedeschi was Italo Svevo's cousin.

Biography 
Tedeschi was born in 1881 in Trieste, Austro-Hungarian Empire. He was a cousin of Italo Svevo. Tedeschi studied in Graz from 1904 to 1906. There, he became a student of the Austrian philosopher, Alexius Meinong. Tedeschi would study and illustrate the latter's theory of objects. Under the tutelage of Stephan Witasek, Tadeschi was introduced to the notion of habit through the latter's idea of value beauty or Wertschönheit. He would expand Witasek's position that habits possess the capacity of creating needs and values. When he returned to Trieste, he attempted to promote and defend the ideas of the Graz School. After completing his education, he first taught the Municipal Gymnasium of Trieste. He became a professor of philosophy and is said to have taught and inspired the Italian writer Giani Stuparich.

In 1911, Tedeschi committed suicide in front of his dying mother, Peppina Tedeschi.

Works 
One of Tedeschi's notable works was a review of Otto Weinenger's Geschlecht und Charackter (1903), which – for some in Italy – became an alternative to Freudian psychoanalysis. Weinenger also committed suicide. Tedeschi was working on the Italian translation of the Grundzüge der allgemeinen Ästhetik when he also took his own life. The text, which was completed by Mariano Graziussi, included three essays that explored Witasek's conceptualization of value and beauty. These were published as part of the introductory article called "La coscienza estetica secondo Stefano Witasek" ("The aesthetic consciousness according to Stefan Witasek").

Tedeschi also authored critical analyses of other thinkers. For example, he identified Otto Weininger as "the antifeminist philosopher", who was able to effectively expand the feminism theme – a topic that he said was vaguely developed in the works of his contemporaries such as Arthur Schopenhauer, Friedrich Nietzsche, and August Strindberg. In his examination of Witasek's conception of value and beauty, Tedeschi suggested that habit has immense potential for creating values and that it facilitates "the apperception of the produced representations", leading to enhanced enjoyment. Tedeschi considered himself a bridge between the Graz and the Florentine schools. Tedeschi's works had been published in periodicals such as Cantoni, Cultura, Rivista di Psic., and Rivista d'Italia.

Publications 
 Tedeschi, Steno (1907). "La coscienza estetica secondo Stefano Witasek", La Cultura Filosofica, I, 5, pp. 128-135
 Tedeschi, Steno (1908). "Un'equivalente aprioristica della metafisica (la teoria degli oggetti)", Rivista filosofica, X, 11.3, pp. 289-303.
 Tedeschi, Steno. (1910). "Sulla funzione conoscitiva del guidizio", La Cultura Filosofica, IV. pp. 32-39.
 Tedeschi, Steno. (1912). "Intorno agli oggetti del pensiero", Rivista di Filosofia, IV, pp. 107-118.

References 

1881 births
1911 deaths
Italian essayists
Writers from Trieste
Abstract object theory
Philosophy academics
Philosophy writers
Suicides in Italy